Nino Antonio Cassanello Layana (12 January 1945 – 26 March 2020) was an Ecuadorian university professor and doctor.

Biography 

Cassanello completed his high school studies at the San José La Salle college, after which he attended university and graduated as an internist doctor. He worked at the Luis Vernaza hospital in Guayaquil for forty years; at the same time, he was a professor at the University of Guayaquil and at the Universidad Católica de Santiago de Guayaquil. He was the author of a book on medical semiology and several scientific articles in the Revista Médica de Nuestros Hospitales of the Board of Charity of Guayaquil.

From an early age Cassanello was fond of horse riding, a hobby he inherited from his father Don Nino Cassanello Zerega; he owned several racehorses from the “Santa Mónica” and “Los Pelados” stables. The Miguel Salem Dibo racetrack held several equestrian classics in his name.

Death 

Cassanello died on 26 March 2020, aged 75, of COVID-19 in Guayaquil, during the pandemic in Ecuador.

References 

1945 births
2020 deaths
Ecuadorian physicians
People from Guayaquil
Deaths from the COVID-19 pandemic in Ecuador